Karl Plintzner (1911–1975) was a German cinematographer. He worked largely for DEFA, the state-owned East German studio.

Selected filmography
 Blum Affair (1948)
 The Marriage of Figaro (1949)
 The Merry Wives of Windsor (1950)
 The Last Year (1951)
 Stärker als die Nacht (1954)
 The Singing Ringing Tree (1957)
 Intrigue and Love (1959)
 Erich Kubak (1959)
 New Year's Eve Punch (1960)

Bibliography
 Poss, Ingrid & Warnecke, Peter. Spur der Filme: Zeitzeugen über die DEFA. Ch. Links Verlag, 2006.

External links

1911 births
1975 deaths
German cinematographers
Film people from Berlin